Beat were a Finnish band who represented their country in Eurovision Song Contest 1990. The group performed the song  Fri? (Free?) in Swedish and finished 21st out of 22 countries, scoring 8 points. The group was composed of members Janne Engblom, Kim Engblom, Tina Krause and Tina Pettersson.

The song was also recorded in Finnish and English.

Discography 
 A Hope For Peace (1981)
 Beat (1990)

Bibliography
 Lyrics the song Fri? (along with translation)

Eurovision Song Contest entrants for Finland
Eurovision Song Contest entrants of 1990
Finnish musical groups